Pilas is a municipality in the province of Seville, Spain.

The first known human settlements date back to the Celtiberian period. During the Roman domination it belonged to the jurisdiction of Seville. It was called Pilias at the time of Al-Andalus, which is when it began to grow around a "Qubba", which still exists. In the surroundings it also had small Muslim farms. The tile factories located near the Alcarayón stream would later develop into the present-day village.

Following the Christian reconquest in the second half of the 13th century, Alfonso X decided to call it Torre del Rey. The village acquired prominence in the 15th century. Due to the importance of its livestock, the king Juan II of Castile granted the village grazing fields in the municipality of Aznalcázar. Since it was on the road to Mures (Villamanrique), Omnius (Hinojos) and Aznalcázar, drinking troughs or pilas for livestock were built in the village.

The growth of industrial activity in the first third of the 20th century contributed to the economic prosperity of the municipality.

References

Municipalities of the Province of Seville